Kalambadi Muhammad Musliyar (1934 – 2 October 2012) was a Sunni Muslim religious scholar from Kerala state and president of Samastha Kerala Jamiyyathul Ulama (EK Faction), one the largest muslim organization of Kerala, from September 2004 until his death on 2 October 2012.

Early life
Kalambadi Usthad was born in an orthodox Muslim family in Kalambadi, a village in Malappuram city, Kerala. After the primary studies in native land, he went to Baqiyathu Swalihath, Vellore, Tamil Nadu. After being graduated from the religious institution of Baqiyath, he returned to the native land and carried on the educational field for years. He was 2nd rank holder in Baqavi graduation.

In Samastha Kerala Jamiyyathul Ulama
He was selected to the Mushavara during the early period of 1971 and was elected as president in 2004 replacing Sayyid Abdurahman Imbichikoya Thangal Al-Aydarusi Al-Azhari (1995–2004).

Demise
The leader of the largest Muslim outfit in Kerala, respected Kalambadi Muhammad Musliyar died on Tuesday, 2 October 2012 in a private hospital in Perinthalmanna following a heart attack.

References 

Indian imams
People from Malappuram district
2012 deaths
Islam in Kerala
1934 births
Kerala Sunni-Shafi'i scholars